Maryam Yektaei (born 19 June 1993) is an Iranian footballer, who plays as a goalkeeper. She has been a member of the Iran women's national team.

By the end of June, 2021, she moved to Turkey and joined Beşiktaş J.K. to play in the Turkish Women's Football Super League.

References

1993 births
Living people
People from Urmia
Iranian women's footballers
Women's association football goalkeepers
Iran women's international footballers
Iranian expatriate footballers
Expatriate women's footballers in Turkey
Iranian expatriate sportspeople in Turkey
Beşiktaş J.K. women's football players
Turkish Women's Football Super League players